St. Mary Medical Center may refer to:

 St. Mary Medical Center (Long Beach), Long Beach, California
 St. Mary's Medical Center (San Francisco), San Francisco
 St. Mary Medical Center (Hobart), Hobart, Indiana
 St. Mary Medical Center (Langhorne), Langhorne, Pennsylvania
 Providence St. Mary Medical Center (Walla Walla), Walla Walla, Washington
 OSF St. Mary Medical Center, Galesburg, Illinois

See also
 Saint Mary's Hospital (disambiguation)
St. Mary's Medical Center (disambiguation) of multiple medical centers
St. Mary's Regional Medical Center (disambiguation)

Trauma centers